A blind stitch in sewing is a method of joining two pieces of fabric so that the stitch thread is invisible, or nearly invisible. Blind stitching hides stitching under folded edges; therefore, this type of stitch can be used to create a blind hem or to join two folded edges together. 

Blind hem stitches are completely hidden on the front of the garment and almost completely hidden on the inside of the garment. The sewer catches only a few threads of the fabric each time the needle is pulled through the fabric, which means that the majority of the stitching is hidden inside the hem.

Blind stitching is useful when joining two folded edges together, as the thread is only visible when the folded material is pulled away. This technique allows the sewer to invisibly attach pockets, facings and trimmings to a garment.  

A sewing machine can also create a blind hem. In this case, a specialty presser foot is needed and the sewer must select the stitch pattern dedicated to blind hems. A zigzag stitch technique may be used with a sewing machine to create a blind stitch.

If a blind stitch hits very close to the fold of the material it does not go all the way through it, and can be used in stitching waterproof seams in neoprene and kamiks.

References

Sewing stitches
Needlework